Adolf Müller was an Austrian footballer. He played in one match for the Austria national football team in 1906.

References

External links
 

Year of birth missing
Year of death missing
Austrian footballers
Austria international footballers
Place of birth missing
Association footballers not categorized by position